Ridley is a British police procedural drama in four standalone stories created and written by Paul Matthew Thompson, the creator of the police drama Vera, and Jonathan Fisher. It is produced by Juliet Charlesworth (4 episodes), Adrian Dunbar, associate producer (episodes 1, 2), and Mike Noble, line producer (4 episodes). The first of the 120-minute feature-length mysteries aired on ITV on 28 August 2022.

Synopsis
The series stars Adrian Dunbar in the role of Alex Ridley. The former detective inspector is brought back in as a consultant 18 months after an early retirement due to a nervous breakdown from having to come to terms with the loss of his wife and daughter in a house fire. He spends some of his retirement time as a pianist and singer in a jazz club of which he is a co-owner. He assists former colleague Carol Farman (Bronagh Waugh), newly promoted to detective inspector.

Episodes
Episode 1: The Peaceful Garden written by Jonathan Fisher and Paul Matthew Thompson. Directed by Bryn Higgins. Aired on ITV, 28 August 2022.
Tasked with solving a complex crime, Ridley investigates the murder of a sheep farmer, and the connections with the disappearance of a young child many years previously, and a convicted sex offender.

Episode 2: Hospitality written by Jonathan Fisher and Paul Matthew Thompson. Directed by Noreen Kershaw. Aired on ITV, 4 September 2022.
In a new case for DI Carol Farman, Ridley is asked to help with an investigation when the body of a young woman is discovered buried on the moors.

Episode 3: Swansong written by Julia Gilbert. Directed by Paul Gay. Aired on ITV, 11 September 2022.
A jazz singer's brother went missing 40 years ago, Ridley decides to help find the brother but the murder of a woman appears to be connected to the case.

Episode 4: The Numbered Days written by Jonathan Fisher, Paul Matthew Thompson. Directed by Paul Gay. Aired on ITV, September 18, 2022
A man falls to his death from a balcony. DI Carol Farman and Ridley investigate.

Cast

Main
Adrian Dunbar as Alex Ridley
George Bukhari as DC Darren Lakhan
Bronagh Waugh as DI Carol Farman
Georgie Glen as Dr. Wendy Newstone
Terence Maynard as DCI Paul Goodwin
Julie Graham as Annie Marling
Bhavna Limbachia as  Geri Farman

Supporting
Aidan McArdle as Michael Flannery
Jacquetta May as Kate Ridley
Tareq Al-Jeddal as Jack Farman
Kitty Watson as Ella Ridley
Steve Holness, Sophie Alloway and Rory Dempsey as the House Band

Guest stars
Joanna Riding as Eve Marbury, a jazz singer (episode 3).

Production

Filming took place on location, mainly in rural areas in the north of England in Lancashire, the Yorkshire Dales and on the Pennine moors, with some scenes set in Bolton.

References

External links

2022 British television series debuts
2020s British crime drama television series
2020s British police procedural television series
2020s British mystery television series
English-language television shows
ITV crime dramas
Television series by All3Media
Television shows set in Yorkshire